Koenders is a Dutch patronymic surname (originally: son of Koen). It may refer to:

Axel Koenders (born 1959), Dutch triathlete 
Bert Koenders (born 1958), Dutch foreign minister (as of 2014)
Julius Gustaaf Arnout Koenders (1886–1957), Surinamese Sranan linguist
Milano Koenders (born 1986), Dutch footballer
Mike Koenders (born 1992), German footballer

Dutch-language surnames
Patronymic surnames